Zachary Conrad (born October 11, 1975) is an American former professional racing cyclist. He won a bronze medal in the team pursuit at the 1995 UCI Track Cycling World Championships.

References

External links

1975 births
Living people
American male cyclists
Sportspeople from Fort Collins, Colorado
American track cyclists